Distributions, also known as Schwartz distributions or generalized functions, are objects that generalize the classical notion of functions in mathematical analysis. Distributions make it possible to differentiate functions whose derivatives do not exist in the classical sense. In particular, any locally integrable function has a distributional derivative.

Distributions are widely used in the theory of partial differential equations, where it may be easier to establish the existence of distributional solutions (weak solutions) than classical solutions, or where appropriate classical solutions may not exist. Distributions are also important in physics and engineering where many problems naturally lead to differential equations whose solutions or initial conditions are singular, such as the Dirac delta function.

In applications to physics and engineering,  are usually infinitely differentiable complex-valued (or real-valued) functions with compact support that are defined on some given non-empty open subset . (Bump functions are examples of test functions.)

Most commonly encountered functions, including all continuous maps  if using  can be canonically reinterpreted as acting via "integration against a test function." Explicitly, this means that such a function  "acts on" a test function  by "sending" it to the number  which is often denoted by  This new action  of  defines a scalar-valued map  whose domain is the space of test functions  This functional  turns out to have the two defining properties of what is known as a : it is linear, and it is also continuous when  is given a certain topology called . The action (the integration ) of this distribution  on a test function  can be interpreted as a weighted average of the distribution on the support of the test function, even if the values of the distribution at a single point are not well-defined. Distributions like  that arise from functions in this way are prototypical examples of distributions, but there exist many distributions that cannot be defined by integration against any function. Examples of the latter include the Dirac delta function and distributions defined to act by integration of test functions  against certain measures  on  Nonetheless, it is still always possible to reduce any arbitrary distribution down to a simpler  of related distributions that do arise via such actions of integration.

Definitions of the appropriate topologies on spaces of test functions and distributions are given in the article on spaces of test functions and distributions. This article is primarily concerned with the definition of distributions, together with their properties and some important examples.

History

The practical use of distributions can be traced back to the use of Green functions in the 1830s to solve ordinary differential equations, but was not formalized until much later.

Notation

The following notation will be used throughout this article:

  denotes the natural numbers.
  will denote a non-negative integer or 
 For two functions  the following notation defines a canonical pairing: 

Definitions of test functions and distributions

Further discussion of the topologies on the spaces of test functions and distributions is given in the article on spaces of test functions and distributions.

The following proposition states two necessary and sufficient conditions for the continuity of a linear function on  that are often straightforward to verify.

Topology on Ck(U)

We now introduce the seminorms that will define the topology on  Different authors sometimes use different families of seminorms so we list the most common families below. However, the resulting topology is the same no matter which family is used.

All of the functions above are non-negative -valued seminorms on  As explained in this article, every set of seminorms on a vector space induces a locally convex vector topology.

Each of the following sets of seminorms 

With this topology,  becomes a locally convex Fréchet space that is  normable.

Topology on Ck(K)

As before, fix  Recall that if  is any compact subset of  then 

If  is finite then  is a Banach space with a topology that can be defined by the norm

And when  then  is even a Hilbert space.

Trivial extensions and independence of Ck(K)'s topology from U

Despite  depending on the open set, the standard notation for  makes no mention of it. 

So assume  are open subsets of  containing 

Given  its  is the function  defined by:

If  is restricted to  then the following induced linear map is a homeomorphism (linear homeomorphisms are called ):

and thus the next map is a topological embedding:

Using the injection

the vector space  is canonically identified with its image in  Because  through this identification,  can also be considered as a subset of 

Canonical LF topology

Recall that  denotes all functions in  that have compact support in  where note that  is the union of all  as  ranges over all compact subsets of  Moreover, for each  is a dense subset of  The special case when  gives us the space of test functions.

The canonical LF-topology can be defined in various ways.

Distributions

One interprets this notation as the distribution  acting on the test function  to give a scalar, or symmetrically as the test function  acting on the distribution

Characterizations of distributions

Proposition. If  is a linear functional on  then the following are equivalent:

  is a distribution;
  is continuous;
  is continuous at the origin;
  is uniformly continuous;
  is a bounded operator;
  is sequentially continuous;
  is sequentially continuous at the origin; in other words,  maps null sequences to null sequences;
  maps null sequences to bounded subsets;
  maps Mackey convergent null sequences to bounded subsets;
 explicitly, for every Mackey convergent null sequence  in  the sequence  is bounded;
 a sequence  is said to be  if there exists a divergent sequence  of positive real numbers such that the sequence  is bounded; every sequence that is Mackey convergent to the origin necessarily converges to the origin (in the usual sense);

 There exists a continuous seminorm  on  such that 
 There exists a constant  and a finite subset  (where  is any collection of continuous seminorms that defines the canonical LF topology on ) such that 
 For every compact subset  there exist constants  and  such that for all  
 For every compact subset  there exist constants  and  such that for all  with support contained in  
 For any compact subset  and any sequence  in  if  converges uniformly to zero for all multi-indices  then

Topology on the space of distributions and its relation to the weak-* topology

Neither topology is metrizable although unlike the weak-* topology, the strong dual topology makes  into a complete nuclear space, to name just a few of its desirable properties.

Neither  nor its strong dual  is a sequential space and so neither of their topologies can be fully described by sequences (in other words, defining only what sequences converge in these spaces is  enough to fully/correctly define their topologies).
More information about the topology that  is endowed with can be found in the article on spaces of test functions and distributions and the articles on polar topologies and dual systems.

A  map from  into another locally convex topological vector space (such as any normed space) is continuous if and only if it is sequentially continuous at the origin. However, this is no longer guaranteed if the map is not linear or for maps valued in more general topological spaces (for example, that are not also locally convex topological vector spaces).

Localization of distributions

Such a structure is known as a sheaf.

Extensions and restrictions to an open subset

Let  be open subsets of  
This assignment  defines the  operator 
 
which is a continuous injective linear map.
Its transpose (explained here) 
 

If  then the (continuous injective linear) trivial extension map  is  a topological embedding (in other words, if this linear injection was used to identify  as a subset of  then 's topology would strictly finer than the subspace topology that  induces on it; importantly, it would  be a topological subspace since that requires equality of topologies) and its range is also  dense in its codomain  Consequently if  then the restriction mapping is neither injective nor surjective.

For instance, if  and  then the distribution

is in  but admits no extension to

Gluing and distributions that vanish in a set

Support of a distribution

Thus

The support of the distribution associated with the Dirac measure at a point  is the set  If the support of a test function  does not intersect the support of a distribution  then  A distribution  is 0 if and only if its support is empty. If  is identically 1 on some open set containing the support of a distribution  then  If the support of a distribution  is compact then it has finite order and there is a constant  and a non-negative integer  such that:

Distributions with compact support

Support in a point set and Dirac measures

That is, there exists an integer  and complex constants  such that

where  is the translation operator.

Distribution with compact support

Distributions of finite order with support in an open subset

Global structure of distributions

It is not immediately clear from the definition how exotic a distribution might be. To answer this question, it is instructive to see distributions built up from a smaller space, namely the space of continuous functions. Roughly, any distribution is locally a (multiple) derivative of a continuous function. A precise version of this result, given below, holds for distributions of compact support, tempered distributions, and general distributions. Generally speaking, no proper subset of the space of distributions contains all continuous functions and is closed under differentiation. This says that distributions are not particularly exotic objects; they are only as complicated as necessary.

Distributions as sheaves

Decomposition of distributions as sums of derivatives of continuous functions

In other words, for arbitrary  we can write:

where  are finite sets of multi-indices and the functions  are continuous.

Note that the infinite sum above is well-defined as a distribution.

Operations on distributions

Many operations which are defined on smooth functions with compact support can also be defined for distributions. In general, if  is a linear map that is continuous with respect to the weak topology, then it is possible to extend  to a map  by passing to the limit.

Preliminaries: Transpose of a linear operator

Operations on distributions and spaces of distributions are often defined using the transpose of a linear operator. This is because the transpose allows for a unified presentation of the many definitions in the theory of distributions and also because its properties are well-known in functional analysis. For instance, the well-known Hermitian adjoint of a linear operator between Hilbert spaces is just the operator's transpose (but with the Riesz representation theorem used to identify each Hilbert space with its continuous dual space). In general, the transpose of a continuous linear map  is the linear map 
 
or equivalently, it is the unique map satisfying  for all  and all  (the prime symbol in  does not denote a derivative of any kind; it merely indicates that  is an element of the continuous dual space ). Since  is continuous, the transpose  is also continuous when both duals are endowed with their respective strong dual topologies; it is also continuous when both duals are endowed with their respective weak* topologies (see the articles polar topology and dual system for more details).

In the context of distributions, the characterization of the transpose can be refined slightly. Let  be a continuous linear map.

where the right-hand side equals

Differential operators

Differentiation of distributions

Let  be the partial derivative operator  To extend  we compute its transpose:

With this definition, every distribution is infinitely differentiable, and the derivative in the direction  is a linear operator on 

More generally, if  is an arbitrary multi-index, then the partial derivative  of the distribution  is defined by

Differentiation of distributions is a continuous operator on  this is an important and desirable property that is not shared by most other notions of differentiation.

If  is a distribution in  then

Differential operators acting on smooth functions

where the vertical maps are given by assigning  its canonical distribution  which is defined by: 
 
With this notation, the diagram commuting is equivalent to:

As discussed above, for any  the transpose may be calculated by:

For the last line we used integration by parts combined with the fact that  and therefore all the functions  have compact support. Continuing the calculation above, for all 

The Lemma combined with the fact that the formal transpose of the formal transpose is the original differential operator, that is,  enables us to arrive at the correct definition: the formal transpose induces the (continuous) canonical linear operator  defined by  We claim that the transpose of this map,  can be taken as  To see this, for every  compute its action on a distribution of the form  with :

Its action on an arbitrary distribution  is defined via:

If  converges to  then for every multi-index  converges to

Multiplication of distributions by smooth functions

A differential operator of order 0 is just multiplication by a smooth function. And conversely, if  is a smooth function then  is a differential operator of order 0, whose formal transpose is itself (that is). The induced differential operator  maps a distribution  to a distribution denoted by  We have thus defined the multiplication of a distribution by a smooth function.

This definition coincides with the transpose definition since if  is the operator of multiplication by the function  (that is), then

so that 

Under multiplication by smooth functions,  is a module over the ring  With this definition of multiplication by a smooth function, the ordinary product rule of calculus remains valid. However, some unusual identities also arise. For example, if  is the Dirac delta distribution on  then  and if  is the derivative of the delta distribution, then

Example.

Example. Suppose  is a sequence of test functions on  that converges to the constant function  For any distribution  on  the sequence  converges to 

Problem of multiplying distributions

It is easy to define the product of a distribution with a smooth function, or more generally the product of two distributions whose singular supports are disjoint. With more effort, it is possible to define a well-behaved product of several distributions provided their wave front sets at each point are compatible. A limitation of the theory of distributions (and hyperfunctions) is that there is no associative product of two distributions extending the product of a distribution by a smooth function, as has been proved by Laurent Schwartz in the 1950s. For example, if  is the distribution obtained by the Cauchy principal value

If  is the Dirac delta distribution then

but,

so the product of a distribution by a smooth function (which is always well-defined) cannot be extended to an associative product on the space of distributions.

Thus, nonlinear problems cannot be posed in general and thus are not solved within distribution theory alone. In the context of quantum field theory, however, solutions can be found. In more than two spacetime dimensions the problem is related to the regularization of divergences. Here Henri Epstein and Vladimir Glaser developed the mathematically rigorous (but extremely technical) . This does not solve the problem in other situations. Many other interesting theories are non-linear, like for example the Navier–Stokes equations of fluid dynamics.

Several not entirely satisfactory theories of algebras of generalized functions have been developed, among which Colombeau's (simplified) algebra is maybe the most popular in use today.

Inspired by Lyons' rough path theory, Martin Hairer proposed a consistent way of multiplying distributions with certain structures (regularity structures), available in many examples from stochastic analysis, notably stochastic partial differential equations. See also Gubinelli–Imkeller–Perkowski (2015) for a related development based on Bony's paraproduct from Fourier analysis.

Composition with a smooth function

The pullback is often denoted  although this notation should not be confused with the use of '*' to denote the adjoint of a linear mapping.

The Inverse function theorem ensures that a submersion satisfies this condition.

If  is a submersion, then  is defined on distributions by finding the transpose map. The uniqueness of this extension is guaranteed since  is a continuous linear operator on  Existence, however, requires using the change of variables formula, the inverse function theorem (locally), and a partition of unity argument.

In the special case when  is a diffeomorphism from an open subset  of  onto an open subset  of  change of variables under the integral gives:

In this particular case, then,  is defined by the transpose formula:

Convolution

Under some circumstances, it is possible to define the convolution of a function with a distribution, or even the convolution of two distributions.

provided that the integral exists.

Importantly, if  has compact support then for any  the convolution map  is continuous when considered as the map  or as the map

Translation and symmetry

Given  the translation operator  sends  to  defined by  This can be extended by the transpose to distributions in the following way: given a distribution   is the distribution  defined by 

Given  define the function  by  Given a distribution  let  be the distribution defined by  The operator  is called .

Convolution of a test function with a distribution

Convolution with  defines a linear map:

which is continuous with respect to the canonical LF space topology on 

If  then by Fubini's theorem

An alternative way to define the convolution of a test function  and a distribution  is to use the translation operator  The convolution of the compactly supported function  and the distribution  is then the function defined for each  by

It can be shown that the convolution of a smooth, compactly supported function and a distribution is a smooth function.

where  denotes the convex hull and  denotes the support.

Convolution of a smooth function with a distribution

satisfying for all :

Let  be the map . If  is a distribution, then  is continuous as a map . If  also has compact support, then  is also continuous as the map  and continuous as the map 

If  is a continuous linear map such that  for all  and all  then there exists a distribution  such that  for all 

Example. Let  be the Heaviside function on  For any 

Let  be the Dirac measure at 0 and let  be its derivative as a distribution. Then  and  Importantly, the associative law fails to hold:

Convolution of distributions

Informally, to define  where  has compact support, the idea is to extend the definition of the convolution  to a linear operation on distributions so that the associativity formula

continues to hold for all test functions 

It is also possible to provide a more explicit characterization of the convolution of distributions. Then the linear maps

are continuous. The transposes of these maps:

are consequently continuous and it can also be shown that

Moreover, if  is a function then  where now the associativity of convolution implies that  for all functions  and 

Suppose that it is  that has compact support. For  consider the function

This generalizes the classical notion of convolution of functions and is compatible with differentiation in the following sense: for every multi-index 

The convolution of a finite number of distributions, all of which (except possibly one) have compact support, is associative.

The convolution of distributions with compact support induces a continuous bilinear map  defined by  where  denotes the space of distributions with compact support. However, the convolution map as a function  is  continuous although it is separately continuous. The convolution maps  and  given by  both  to be continuous. Each of these non-continuous maps is, however, separately continuous and hypocontinuous.

Convolution versus multiplication

In general, regularity is required for multiplication products, and locality is required for convolution products. It is expressed in the following extension of the Convolution Theorem which guarantees the existence of both convolution and multiplication products. Let  be a rapidly decreasing tempered distribution or, equivalently,  be an ordinary (slowly growing, smooth) function within the space of tempered distributions and let  be the normalized (unitary, ordinary frequency) Fourier transform.

hold within the space of tempered distributions. In particular, these equations become the Poisson Summation Formula if  is the Dirac Comb.
Paley-Wiener functions  better known as bandlimited functions, belong to the space of  

For example, let  be the Dirac comb and  be the Dirac delta;then  is the function that is constantly one and both equations yield the Dirac-comb identity. Another example is to let  be the Dirac comb and  be the rectangular function; then  is the sinc function and both equations yield the Classical Sampling Theorem for suitable  functions. They are known as mollifiers, especially in partial differential equations theory, or as regularizers in physics because they allow turning generalized functions into regular functions.

Tensor products of distributions

Let  and  be open sets. Assume all vector spaces to be over the field  where  or  For  define for every  and every  the following functions:

Given  and  define the following functions:

where  and  

Spaces of distributions

For all  and all  every one of the following canonical injections is continuous and has an image (also called the range) that is a dense subset of its codomain:

The range of each of the maps above (and of any composition of the maps above) is dense in its codomain.

Because the canonical injection  is a continuous injection whose image is dense in the codomain, this map's transpose  is a continuous injection. This transpose map is continuous but it is  necessarily a topological embedding.
Almost all of the spaces of distributions mentioned in this article arise in this way (for example, tempered distribution, restrictions, distributions of order  some integer, distributions induced by a positive Radon measure, distributions induced by an -function, etc.) and any representation theorem about the continuous dual space of  may, through the transpose  be transferred directly to elements of the space

Radon measures

The inclusion map  is a continuous injection whose image is dense in its codomain, so the transpose  is also a continuous injection.

Note that the continuous dual space  can be identified as the space of Radon measures, where there is a one-to-one correspondence between the continuous linear functionals  and integral with respect to a Radon measure; that is,

 if  then there exists a Radon measure  on  such that for all  and

If  is a locally integrable function on  then the distribution  is a Radon measure; so Radon measures form a large and important space of distributions.

The following is the theorem of the structure of distributions of Radon measures, which shows that every Radon measure can be written as a sum of derivatives of locally  functions on :

Positive Radon measures

Lebesgue measure is an example of a positive Radon measure.

Locally integrable functions as distributions

One particularly important class of Radon measures are those that are induced locally integrable functions. This is a large class of functions that includes all continuous functions and all Lp space  functions.

Similarly, every Radon measure  on  defines an element of  whose value on the test function  is  As above, it is conventional to abuse notation and write the pairing between a Radon measure  and a test function  as  Conversely, as shown in a theorem by Schwartz (similar to the Riesz representation theorem), every distribution which is non-negative on non-negative functions is of this form for some (positive) Radon measure.

Test functions as distributions

The test functions are themselves locally integrable, and so define distributions. Or equivalently,

Distributions with compact support

The inclusion map  is a continuous injection whose image is dense in its codomain, so the transpose map  is also a continuous injection. Thus the image of the transpose, denoted by  forms a space of distributions.

The elements of  can be identified as the space of distributions with compact support. Explicitly, if  is a distribution on  then the following are equivalent,

 

Conversely, it can be shown that every continuous linear functional on this space defines a distribution of compact support.

Distributions of finite order

Let  The inclusion map  is a continuous injection whose image is dense in its codomain, so the transpose  is also a continuous injection. Consequently, the image of  denoted by  forms a space of distributions.

Structure of distributions of finite order

The following is the theorem of the structure of distributions of finite order, which shows that every distribution of finite order can be written as a sum of derivatives of Radon measures:

Example. (Distributions of infinite order) Let  and for every test function  let 

Tempered distributions and Fourier transform 

Tempered distributions are useful if one studies the Fourier transform since all tempered distributions have a Fourier transform, which is not true for an arbitrary distribution in

Schwartz space

The Schwartz space  is the space of all smooth functions that are rapidly decreasing at infinity along with all partial derivatives. Thus  is in the Schwartz space provided that any derivative of  multiplied with any power of  converges to 0 as  These functions form a complete TVS with a suitably defined family of seminorms. More precisely, for any multi-indices  and  define:

Then  is in the Schwartz space if all the values satisfy:

The family of seminorms  defines a locally convex topology on the Schwartz space. For  the seminorms are, in fact, norms on the Schwartz space. One can also use the following family of seminorms to define the topology:

Otherwise, one can define a norm on  via

The Schwartz space is a Fréchet space (that is, a complete metrizable locally convex space).

The Schwartz space is nuclear and the tensor product of two maps induces a canonical surjective TVS-isomorphisms

where  represents the completion of the injective tensor product (which in this case is identical to the completion of the projective tensor product).

Tempered distributions

The inclusion map  is a continuous injection whose image is dense in its codomain, so the transpose  is also a continuous injection. Thus, the image of the transpose map, denoted by  forms a space of distributions.

It is the continuous dual space of the Schwartz space. Equivalently, a distribution  is a tempered distribution if and only if

The derivative of a tempered distribution is again a tempered distribution. Tempered distributions generalize the bounded (or slow-growing) locally integrable functions; all distributions with compact support and all square-integrable functions are tempered distributions.

Fourier transform

To study the Fourier transform, it is best to consider complex-valued test functions and complex-linear distributions. The Fourier transform is a TVS isomorphism from the space of tempered distributions onto itself. This operation is compatible with differentiation in the sense that

Expressing tempered distributions as sums of derivatives

If  is a tempered distribution, then there exists a constant  and positive integers  and  such that for all Schwartz functions 

This estimate, along with some techniques from functional analysis, can be used to show that there is a continuous slowly increasing function  and a multi-index  such that

Restriction of distributions to compact sets

Using holomorphic functions as test functions

The success of the theory led to an investigation of the idea of hyperfunction, in which spaces of holomorphic functions are used as test functions. A refined theory has been developed, in particular Mikio Sato's algebraic analysis, using sheaf theory and several complex variables. This extends the range of symbolic methods that can be made into rigorous mathematics, for example, Feynman integrals.

See also

 
 
 
 
 
 
 
 
 
 

Differential equations related

 
 
 

Generalizations of distributions

Notes

References

Bibliography

 
 .
 
.
 .
 .
 .
 .
  
  
  
 .
  
  
 .
 .
 .
 .
 .

Further reading

 M. J. Lighthill (1959). Introduction to Fourier Analysis and Generalised Functions. Cambridge University Press.  (requires very little knowledge of analysis; defines distributions as limits of sequences of functions under integrals)
 V.S. Vladimirov (2002). Methods of the theory of generalized functions. Taylor & Francis. 
 .
 .
 .
 .
 .

Articles containing proofs
Functional analysis
Generalizations of the derivative
Generalized functions
Smooth functions
Schwartz distributions
Differential equations
Linear functionals